Keratin, type I cuticular Ha5 is a keratin protein that in humans is encoded by the  KRT35 gene.

References